Tiphioidea is a suggested superfamily of stinging wasps in the order Hymenoptera. There are three families in Tiphioidea, Bradynobaenidae, Tiphiidae, and Sierolomorphidae.

Recent research in molecular phylogenetics has resulted in the reorganization of the infraorder Aculeata, which now contains eight superfamilies: Apoidea, Chrysidoidea, Formicoidea, Pompiloidea, Scolioidea, Tiphioidea, Thynnoidea, and Vespoidea.

References

Further reading

External links

 

Hymenoptera
Apocrita superfamilies